Dysgonia hercodes is a moth of the family Noctuidae first described by Edward Meyrick in 1902. It is found in the Australian state of Queensland.

References

Dysgonia